2-Hydroxy-N-methyltryptamine (2-HO-NMT) is a tryptamine and is the 2-hydroxy analog of N-methyltryptamine (NMT). It is briefly mentioned in Alexander Shulgin's book TiHKAL (Tryptamines I Have Known and Loved) under the DMT entry and is stated to be found in Desmanthus illinoensis.

See also 
NMT
DMT

References

Tryptamines